The Museum of Contemporary Art is an art museum in Bangkok, Thailand. It is privately owned by business executive Boonchai Bencharongkul, and was opened in 2012. The museum, one of the largest contemporary art museums in Asia, features an extensive collection of works by many famous Thai artists, including Thawan Duchanee, Hem Vejakorn, Chalermchai Kositpipat and Prateep Kochabua.

MOCA houses a sizable collection of priceless artwork made by renowned Thai painters and sculptors. The main goal of the museum was to constantly share, spread, and preserve true Thai art and culture with both Thais and others from across the world, especially the next generation.

Artworks 
There are 5 floor in Moca where in each floor display different theme of art

1st floor 
There are four display halls. Two rooms are available for temporary exhibits, and another two halls are used to display the works of two National Artists and a Sculptor of Distinction. The exhibition features sculptures by national artist Professor Chalood Nimsamer, as well as paintings that highlight important facets of current Thai art. Additionally on show are pieces by Paitun Muangsomboon, who is also a National Artist in Sculpture. Additionally on show are pieces by Khien Yimsiri, a Thai modern sculpture pioneer and an Artist of Distinction. The works of Yimsiri are innovative, distinctive, and seamlessly combine Thainess and universality. His idea was influenced by Thai heritage and culture in general as well as the design of Buddha images from the Sukhothai Period.

2nd floor 
The exhibition features a wide range of unique viewpoints. Every piece of art depicts the way of life and social events of the modern day. A collection of mixed-media works by national artist in visual arts Kamol Tassananchalee are on exhibit in the lobby. He is a creator of art who has independently established his own artistic identity.

3rd floor 
This floor shows magnificent works of current Thai art and incredibly innovative artwork. Works by a number of artists, including Sompop Budtarad, Chuang Moolpinit, Somphong Adulyasarapan, and Prateep Kochabua, are included. The "House of Phimphilalai" is a room that is devoted to the Thai classical literature of Khun Chang and Khun Paen. It focuses particularly on Phimphilalai, a stunning woman who was the subject of a fight between two men, as shown in two ways by two artists from two distinct generations, Hem Vejkorn and Sukee Som-ngoen.

4th floor 
There are a variety of works created by Thawan Duchanee, a renowned artist and philosopher from Thailand who received the National Artist in Painting award in 2001. Included are various oil paintings on canvas, drawings, carvings in wood, and weaponry made by this incredibly unique and artistic skill. Additionally, a room including works by Tawee Nandakwang, Chakrapan Posayakrit, and Angkarn Kalayanapongsa is devoted to Great Thai Artists. The three enormous modern paintings depicting The Three Kingdoms (containing Heaven, Middle Earth, and Hell) by three painters, Sompop Budtarad, Panya Vijinthanasarn, and Prateep Kochabua, are another feature of this level.

5th floor 
The floor displays modern art from different nations, including the USA, China, Vietnam, Malaysia, Japan, Russia, Italy, and Norway. The most accomplished Romantic artists' paintings are on display in the iconic Richard Green room, which has a curved roof and resembles a European museum. When Queen Victoria ascended to the British throne, the fashion was still popular. It was also popular when the Great King Rama V made his first trip to Europe in 1897. There are works by John William Godward and Sir Lawrence Alma Tadema. These paintings, some of which date back nearly three centuries, are all determined to be remarkably well-preserved.

Gallery

References

Museums in Bangkok
Art museums and galleries in Thailand
Chatuchak district
Art museums established in 2012
2012 establishments in Thailand
Thai contemporary art